Great Barrier Reef Airport , also known as Hamilton Island Airport, is a privately owned public use aerodrome and is the primary airport of the Whitsunday Islands, as well as the airport of Hamilton Island. The airport is settled on mostly reclaimed land and is commercially served year-round by Jetstar, Virgin Australia and Qantas. Hamilton Island Airport handles flights from Sydney, Melbourne and Brisbane and is also the airport launch pad for scenic flights to the Great Barrier Reef and Whitehaven Beach. Private flights and charters also fly into Great Barrier Reef Airport, along with locally operated helicopters, light planes and seaplanes.

Built in the 1980s, Ansett Australia had exclusive rights to serve the airport, as part of its 50% shareholding. Ansett sold its shareholding to the BT Hotel Group in May 1998, allowing Qantas to begin to serve the airport. The airport suffered heavily in September 2001 with the demise of Ansett Australia, which operated more heavily out of the airport than any other airline with flights to Cairns, Townsville, Brisbane, the Gold Coast, Sydney, Melbourne and Adelaide.

In the year ending 30 June 2011 the airport handled 457,641 passengers making it the 19th busiest airport in Australia.

Airlines and destinations

Operations

*Sydney route included from July 2009

See also
 List of airports in Queensland

References

External links

Airports in Queensland
Ansett Australia
Whitsunday Islands